Achina is a town in Aguata in the local Government area of Anambra State, Nigeria.  It’s made up of two villages, umueleke and umueziyi. Achina has common boundaries with Akpo, Umuchu, Ogboji, Uga.

The inhabitants are members of the Igbo people.

Climate
Achina has two climate classifications, and they are the wet climate and the dry or savanna climate.

References

Towns in Anambra State